Luana Anders (born Luana Margo Anderson, May 12, 1938 – July 21, 1996) was an American film and television actress and screenwriter.

Career
Anders began her career with supporting roles for American International Pictures. Some of the early films she appeared in were directed by Roger Corman. Anders was part of a group of actors who met in the acting class of actor Jeff Corey. They included Jack Nicholson, Sally Kellerman, and Robert Towne.

Anders appeared in a number of low-budget films, including starring roles in Life Begins at 17 and Reform School Girls, along with Sally Kellerman. Her best-known performances may have been as Vincent Price's sister in Corman's The Pit and the Pendulum (1961) and as a murder victim in Francis Ford Coppola's Dementia 13 (1963). She also appeared in Curtis Harrington's cult film Night Tide (1961) opposite Dennis Hopper, who later cast her as one of the hippie commune girls who go skinny-dipping with Hopper and Peter Fonda in Easy Rider (1969).

Anders appeared in Robert Altman's That Cold Day in the Park, which premiered in 1969 at the Cannes Film Festival, as well as being cast in several of her friend Jack Nicholson's films, including The Trip (1967), The Last Detail (1973), The Missouri Breaks (1976), Goin' South (1978), and The Two Jakes (1990). Her other film credits include When the Legends Die (1972), The Killing Kind (1973), Shampoo (1975), Personal Best (1982), Movers & Shakers (1985), You Can't Hurry Love (1988), Doppelganger (1993), Wild Bill (1995), and American Strays (1996).

She appeared in a wide range of episodic television, including The Rifleman, Sugarfoot, the "Incident of the Running Man" episode of Rawhide, The Andy Griffith Show, One Step Beyond, Dragnet, as Theresa Ames in "The Guests" (an episode of The Outer Limits), Adam-12 and Hunter. She appeared briefly in several soap operas, including Santa Barbara in the 1991–1992 season.

As a writer, she wrote the original screenplay of Fire on the Amazon (using the pseudonym Margo Blue) for executive producer Roger Corman. She also co-wrote the comedy film Limit Up for MCEG/Virgin with Richard Martini and had a cameo role in the film.

Personal life
Anders was a lifelong Buddhist and supporter of the American chapter of Soka Gakkai International (SGI). She died of breast cancer in 1996, aged 58.

Filmography

Film

Television

References

External links

 
 
 
 

Actresses from California
American television actresses
American women screenwriters
Deaths from breast cancer
Deaths from cancer in California
American Buddhists
1938 births
1996 deaths
Actresses from New York City
American film actresses
20th-century American actresses
20th-century American women writers
Screenwriters from New York (state)
20th-century American screenwriters